The 2015–16 UEFA Youth League UEFA Champions League Path (group stage) was played from 15 September to 9 December 2015. A total of 32 teams competed in the UEFA Champions League Path (group stage) to decide 16 of the 24 places in the knockout phase of the 2015–16 UEFA Youth League.

Draw

The youth teams of the 32 clubs which qualified for the 2015–16 UEFA Champions League group stage entered the UEFA Champions League Path.

The 32 teams were drawn into eight groups of four. There was no separate draw held, with the group compositions identical to the draw for the 2015–16 UEFA Champions League group stage, which was held on 27 August 2015, 17:45 CEST, at the Grimaldi Forum in Monaco.

Format
In each group, teams played against each other home-and-away in a round-robin format. The eight group winners advanced to the round of 16, while the eight runners-up advanced to the play-offs, where they were joined by the eight second round winners from the Domestic Champions Path.

Tiebreakers
The teams were ranked according to points (3 points for a win, 1 point for a draw, 0 points for a loss). If two or more teams were equal on points on completion of the group matches, the following criteria were applied in the order given to determine the rankings (regulations Article 14.03):
higher number of points obtained in the group matches played among the teams in question;
superior goal difference from the group matches played among the teams in question;
higher number of goals scored in the group matches played among the teams in question;
higher number of goals scored away from home in the group matches played among the teams in question;
if, after having applied criteria 1 to 4, teams still had an equal ranking, criteria 1 to 4 were reapplied exclusively to the matches between the teams in question to determine their final rankings. If this procedure did not lead to a decision, criteria 6 to 12 applied;
superior goal difference in all group matches;
higher number of goals scored in all group matches;
higher number of away goals scored in all group matches;
higher number of wins in all group matches;
higher number of away wins in all group matches;
lower disciplinary points total based only on yellow and red cards received in all group matches (red card = 3 points, yellow card = 1 point, expulsion for two yellow cards in one match = 3 points);
drawing of lots.

Groups
The matchdays were 15–16 September, 29–30 September, 20–21 October, 3–4 November, 24–25 November, and 8–9 December 2015. Times up to 24 October 2015 (matchdays 1–3) were CEST (UTC+2), thereafter (matchdays 4–6) times were CET (UTC+1).

Group A

Group B

Group C

Group D

Group E

Group F

Group G

Group H

References

External links
2015–16 UEFA Youth League

1